Buzz Lightyear is one of the main characters in the Disney/Pixar Toy Story franchise, in which he is mainly voiced by Tim Allen. He is a superhero toy action figure based on the in-universe media franchise consisting of a blockbuster feature film and animated series, a Space Ranger. He is the only Toy Story character in all of the franchise's animated films, including spin-offs, although his friend  Woody is the main protagonist in all of the four films of the series. In Toy Story (1995), unlike most other toys, Buzz initially believes himself to be the "real" Buzz Lightyear, and comes to terms with actually being just a toy; in Toy Story 2 (1999), Buzz encounters other Buzz Lightyear action figures from the toyline who similarly believe themselves to be "real", including one of the character's in-universe archenemy and father: Emperor Zurg; in Toy Story 3 (2010), set ten years later, Buzz explores a romance with cowgirl figure Jessie, while his Spanish mode is also uncovered; while in Toy Story 4 (2019), Buzz finds his inner voice and bids farewell to Woody, who leaves to be with Bo Peep.

The in-universe Buzz Lightyear, Space Ranger fictional character whom the toy Buzz is based on also appears in the 2000 direct-to-video film Buzz Lightyear of Star Command: The Adventure Begins, and subsequent spin-off television series Buzz Lightyear of Star Command, voiced respectively by Allen and Patrick Warburton. Chris Evans voiced this version of the character in the 2022 spin-off film Lightyear, presented as an in-universe film the characters in Toy Story would watch (as previously depicted in the opening scene of The Adventure Begins) exploring their origin story, with James Brolin additionally voicing an elderly, nihilistic version of Buzz from an alternate future, known as Zurg (a separate character from Emperor Zurg).

Conception and creation
Buzz Lightyear's name was in honor of Apollo 11 astronaut Edwin "Buzz" Aldrin, the second person to walk on the Moon. According to Pixar producers, the character was provisionally named Lunar Larry, but it sounded "too wacky". Aldrin acknowledged the tribute when he pulled a Buzz Lightyear toy out during a speech at NASA. A clip of this can be found on the Toy Story 10th Anniversary DVD. Aldrin did not receive any endorsement fees for the use of his nickname.

Regarding the design of Lightyear, Toy Story director John Lasseter said he wanted to create an action figure in the line of G.I. Joe for the film and decided upon a spaceman figure. Lasseter attributes his design to the influence of Apollo astronauts, in particular, their clear helmets, skullcaps, communication devices, and white suits.

The purple and fluorescent green color scheme were the favorite colors of Lasseter and his wife's respectively. The looks of television actor Ed Kemmer are also believed to be a prototype for Lightyear. Kemmer played Commander Buzz Corry in Space Patrol, one of the first science-fiction series on American television.

Originally, when a screen test was being made, producers wanted Buzz to be voiced by Billy Crystal. He turned the role down, and after seeing the first film, he said that turning it down was "the biggest mistake of his career".

Appearances

in productions

Buzz Lightyear, toy

Toy Story (1995) 

In the animated film Toy Story, Buzz Lightyear, an action figure, is given to a boy named Andy Davis from his mother as a birthday present. He quickly impresses the other toys with his skills, flashy accessories and wings, and soon becomes Andy's favorite toy. Sheriff Woody, the former favorite toy, quickly becomes jealous. It soon becomes apparent that Buzz is unaware he is a toy, genuinely believing that he is a space ranger sent to stop the Evil Emperor Zurg. He further believes that his red light bulb "laser" is a deadly weapon, his wings are functional aircraft-grade steel, and that he cannot breathe with his helmet open.

After Woody unintentionally knocks Buzz out of Andy's bedroom window, Buzz follows and confronts Woody in Andy's car. The two become separated from Andy while fighting, and Woody tries to convince Buzz he is a toy but fails. The two are soon captured by Andy's sadistic neighbor, Sid Phillips. Buzz sees a commercial on a TV in Sid's house which reveals he is a toy. In denial, Buzz tries to fly and ends up breaking his arm. He falls into despair.

Sid's toys fix Buzz's arm, and Sid tapes him to a rocket with the intention to blow him up. Woody convinces Buzz his purpose is to make Andy happy; eventually causing Buzz to regain his resolve. He teams up with Woody to escape Sid and return to Andy. As the two pursue Andy's van, Woody is attacked by Sid's dog Scud. Buzz fights off the dog to rescue Woody, and Woody uses RC to rescue Buzz. When the two are still unable to catch up to Andy, Woody is forced to light the rocket and launch them into the air; Buzz opens his wings to sever the tape holding him to the rocket, saving them from exploding and flying solo for the first time, albeit, while carrying Woody. After they are reunited with Andy, Buzz and Woody remain close friends.

Toy Story 2 

In the animated film Toy Story 2, Woody is kidnapped by a greedy toy collector named Al McWhiggin, who is intent on selling him and other "Woody's Roundup" toys to a toy museum in Japan. Buzz leads Mr. Potato Head, Slinky Dog, Rex, and Hamm on a daring rescue mission. They travel to the Al's Toy Barn store, which they believe Woody was taken to. The trip involves crossing a busy road. Buzz uses traffic cones to help the group avoid being crushed by cars.

In the store, the toys get separated. Buzz discovers an aisle full of his fellow Buzz Lightyear toys, one of which has a fancy Utility Belt. When Buzz tries to touch the belt, the Utility Belt Buzz comes to life; also believing he is a real space ranger. He quickly "arrests" Andy's Buzz as a rogue space ranger. Andy's Buzz mocks himself and earlier delusions while Utility Belt Buzz berates him for "backtalk" and imprisons him for "court martial" in an empty Buzz Lightyear case. Andy's Buzz unsuccessfully tries to explain that he and Utility Belt Buzz are both toys.

Soon, the other toys find Utility Belt Buzz and mistake him for Andy's Buzz. Andy's Buzz fails to get their attention and is forced to escape the box on his own. He pursues them out of the store and across the road to Al's apartment. Buzz inadvertently frees an Evil Emperor Zurg action figure while doing so, and he pursues him with intent to destroy him.

Andy's Buzz rejoins the group, and convinces Woody, who had been worried about Andy growing up and had considered going to Japan, that it would be better to come home. Woody invites the other Roundup toys to come with them; Jessie and Bullseye agree, but Stinky Pete refuses and locks them in (and Buzz out) when they try to escape. Al reappears and takes Woody and the Roundup toys to the airport. Andy's Buzz and Utility Belt Buzz pursue Al into the elevator shaft with the other toys. Zurg confronts them, and he reveals he is Utility Belt Buzz's father. Rex accidentally knocks him down the elevator shaft.

Utility Belt Buzz stays behind with a reformed Zurg, while Andy's Buzz and the other toys steal a Pizza Planet truck and drive to the airport. Andy's Buzz stands on a pizza box and operating the steering wheel. At the airport, they subdue Stinky Pete and rescue Woody and Bullseye in the baggage handling system. Buzz and Woody ride Bullseye onto the runway to rescue Jessie from the airplane before it takes off for Japan. The toys all return home in a stolen baggage cart.

By the end of the film, Buzz has developed a crush on Jessie. He and Woody decide not to worry about Andy growing up, as they will always have each other as friends for "infinity and beyond".

Toy Story 3 

In the animated film Toy Story 3, Woody, Buzz, and the other toys accidentally end up in a daycare center after Andy's mother mistakes them for trash while Andy is packing for college. Woody unsuccessfully tries to convince the other toys it was a mistake. Buzz, who was going to be put in the attic with most of Andy's other toys, decides the best thing the toys can do is to stay together at the daycare. This causes Woody to strike out on his own in search of Andy, who had earlier faced a difficult decision as to whether to take Woody or Buzz with him to college.

Meanwhile, Andy's toys are greeted by Lots-o’-Huggin' Bear (Lotso for short), who is seemingly the leader of the daycare toys. He assigns them to the Caterpillar Room, where they are subjected to a very rough playtime by children far too young to play safely with toys like them. At the behest of the other toys, Buzz finds Lotso to kindly request a transfer to the Butterfly Room if possible. When Buzz rejects Lotso's offer to join his gang upon hearing his friends couldn't be involved, Lotso orders his henchmen to switch Buzz to "demo" mode.

In the state, Buzz's memories and original personality appear to be erased; his space ranger delusions from the first film return. Lotso takes the opportunity to make Buzz think Andy's toys are minions of Zurg. The brainwashed Buzz angrily imprisons his friends when they attempt to escape; tasked to watch over the "prisoners" every night. Woody, now aware of the truth behind Lotso, returns to Sunnyside. Andy's toys subdue Buzz attempting to restore his memories, but accidentally reset him to his "Spanish Mode", confusing many characters and resulting in many comedic character changes for the audience.

Buzz still believes he is a real space ranger and still does not have his memories. Woody manages to convince him Andy's toys are his "amigos". The Spanish Buzz helps the toys escape Sunnyside; making no secret of his love for Jessie. Lotso confronts them as they reach the dumpster outside the daycare. In the ensuing altercation, Lotso and all of Andy's toys are dumped into a garbage truck. Buzz heroically rescues Jessie from getting buried in trash, but ends up crushed by a broken TV. Jessie breaks down in tears over Buzz's "dead" body, only for Buzz to awaken unharmed with his normal personality/memories restored(albeit with no recollection of the events that occurred during his brainwashing and Spanish Mode).

At the landfill, they toys are pushed onto a conveyor belt. Buzz and Woody rescue Lotso from a shredder and help him reach an emergency stop button. Lotso abandons them, however, and they fall into an incinerator. Buzz and Jessie join hands and face the approaching fire, prompting everyone else to do the same. The three toy aliens operating a claw rescue them, and they make their way home. Andy donates them all to a little girl Woody met at the daycare, Bonnie. When introducing Buzz, Andy describes him as "the coolest toy ever". As the toys settle in at Bonnie's house, Buzz finds himself performing a romantic paso doble with Jessie to the Spanish version of "You've Got a Friend in Me" as the film ends; much to the amusement of the other toys.

Toy Story 4 

In the animated film Toy Story 4, Buzz plays a significantly smaller role since the film is centered on Woody, Bo, and a host of new characters. He still acts as Woody's moral support, and tries to comfort Woody when he begins to sense Bonnie is no longer interested in Woody. Buzz also learns about the "inner voice", but mistakenly believes the term refers to his button-activated voice box and catchphrases. He spends much of the film using said voice box to guide him as to what he must do next.

When Woody and Bonnie's new favorite toy, Forky, are separated from the group during an RV trip, Buzz, guided by his "inner voice", pursues them into a carnival. He is captured by a vendor and put up with other toys as a potential prize at a game, where he encounters conjoined plushies Bunny and Ducky. Bunny and Ducky are initially antagonistic, as they believe Buzz has come to lower their chances of ever being won and owned by a kid. The two refuse to listen to his explanations, and become further enraged when Buzz frees them and himself from the game. Thinking they will now never be owned, they pursue and attack a bewildered Buzz, until Woody, who has now met up with Bo Peep and rejoined Buzz, offers to take the two plushies to Bonnie after Forky is rescued.

Buzz, Bunny, and Ducky join forces, and are tasked with retrieving keys from an antique store owner to free Forky, who is trapped inside the store. They succeed, but the mission to rescue Forky fails because of the antique store owner's cat. After Woody and Bo have a falling-out, Buzz's inner voice guides him to rejoin Andy's toys, which he does. Later, Forky is freed by Woody and reports that Woody and several other toys need rescuing - Buzz, Jessie, and the others take over the controls of the RV and force Bonnie's dad to drive it back to the carnival.

Woody and Buzz meet up at a carousel, and Buzz notices that Woody is feeling heartbroken about having to part ways with Bo Peep again. Buzz suggests that Woody stay behind to be with Bo, knowing that Bonnie will be okay even without him. Knowing that this might be the last time they will see each other, they share a final goodbye hug, part ways, and exchange their last words of dialogue from afar. Buzz says "to infinity...", and Woody completes the sentence with "...and beyond."

Toy Story 5
Buzz is set to appear in Toy Story 5 and will be voiced by Tim Allen.

Buzz Lightyear, Space Ranger

Buzz Lightyear of Star Command 

In the television series Buzz Lightyear of Star Command, Buzz Lightyear is a Space Ranger working for Star Command, protecting the universe from Evil Emperor Zurg. He works in a team alongside Mira Nova, a princess; Booster, a janitor; and XR, a robot. This version of Buzz Lightyear has a different personality from the one in Toy Story. Buzz Lightyear also has had many love interests on the show. He once had a friend and partner named Warp Darkmatter, however, he later joined Evil Emperor Zurg and became his primary agent. Buzz Lightyear also seems to never take off the purple headwear that he has with his Space Ranger uniform. Aside from his regular catchphrase, he has a habit of telling villains that "Evil never wins!"

Lightyear 

In the Toy Story universe, The 2022 animated film Lightyear is the origin of the character on which the Buzz Lightyear of Star Command toy line was based. The film, which was directed by Angus MacLane, tells the story of young astronaut Buzz Lightyear, who, after being marooned on a hostile planet with his commander and crew, tries to find a way back home while confronting a threat to the universe's safety. Buzz was confirmed to be voiced by Chris Evans and the film was released on June 17, 2022.

Other appearances
 
Buzz Lightyear, voiced by Pat Fraley, appears in the computer games Disney's Animated Storybook: Toy Story and Disney's Activity Center: Toy Story, both released in 1996. A Buzz Lightyear toy also appears in Pixar's 2003 film Finding Nemo. He also appeared as a car in Pixar's 2006 movie, Cars, along with Woody and Hamm. He is also seen in the Toy Story Treats realised in 1996 and all three Toy Story Toons episodes Hawaiian Vacation, Small Fry, and Partysaurus Rex, and the two specials: Toy Story of Terror! and Toy Story That Time Forgot.

Buzz was also in the 2008 Disney film Bedtime Stories and the 2010 Disney film The Sorcerer's Apprentice. Buzz Lightyear and Woody appear as piñatas in Pixar's 2017 film Coco. Woody and Buzz appeared in the 2019 video game Kingdom Hearts III as guest party members, where Buzz gains the ability to use his laser. He is also able to fly as his fictional counterpart without knowing during a Keyblade war crisis across dimensions. Woody eventually recalls him back to normal reality.

Buzz Lightyear is a meetable character at all of the Disney Parks and Resorts, located in Tomorrowland and in Toy Story Land. He is often accompanied by the Aliens. Tim Allen reprised his role using one of his archival recordings in the 2018 Walt Disney Animation Studios film Ralph Breaks the Internet, where he repeated his famous catchphrase.

Merchandise
In 1995, Thinkway Toys introduced a 12-inch-tall Buzz Lightyear figure.

The figure was subject to mass sales in the Christmas after the film's release, mainly in the United States and the United Kingdom. In 1995, Thinkway did not think that Toy Story would be that popular and hence did not make enough dolls to meet demand, as referenced in Toy Story 2. Originally, Tim Allen's voice was on the action figure, but later models feature a voice actor who sounds similar to Allen.

In October 2009 and 2010, to coincide with Toy Storys 3-D re-release and the release of Toy Story 3 respectively, Thinkway Toys released a replica Buzz Lightyear figure based on the figure in the Toy Story movies as part of their Toy Story Collection series of toys and Disney released their own version of a replica Buzz Lightyear figure. Both Buzz Lightyears were much more accurately detailed than the other Buzz Lightyear figures and both had features similar to the figure seen in the movie with similar pop-out wings complete with blinking lights at the wingtips, laser, wrist communicator and the two figures had over 65 and 30 phrases with an original voice respectively. However, the Thinkway Toys figure lacks the karate chop action, while the Disney Store version has it. Only the Thinkway Toys figure comes with a Certificate of Authenticity and both come packaged in the spaceship packaging as seen in the movies. Another 2009 Buzz Lightyear figure by Thinkway Toys included the utility belt from Toy Story 2.

In May 2008, NASA and Disney announced that an original Thinkway Toys Buzz Lightyear action figure would fly aboard the Space Shuttle Discovery on mission STS-124. The 12-inch toy was to remain on the International Space Station (ISS) for six months, where it would take part in an experiment and appear in a video downlink from space whilst the Space Shuttle delivers the largest module of the space station – Kibō, the Japanese Experiment Module pressurized section. The flight was arranged as part of the Toys in Space program that began in 1985.

The mission launched with Buzz Lightyear aboard on May 31, 2008, to celebrate the opening of Toy Story Midway Mania! at Disney's Hollywood Studios and Disney California Adventure Park theme parks, with the ultimate destination of the ISS. The action figure "ate" dinner with the 10 astronauts and cosmonauts and was seen peering out a window aboard the ISS. The action figure stayed aboard the space station for a period of six months as part of the toys-in-space educational program.

The action figure returned from the space station on September 11, 2009, aboard mission STS-128.

In 2009, Lego began releasing its Lego Toy Story line, which included a 205-piece Buzz Lightyear action figure. When the figure is completely built, it has an articulating head, arms, hands, torso, legs, feet, wings, and visor. Lego also created a Buzz Lightyear minifigure. In 2016 a new version of Buzz Lightyear was created for the Lego minifigures Disney series. This minifigure featured new prints for the legs and arms of the minifigure and removed the Star Command logo from the chest of the torso piece. A simpler version of this minifigure appeared in the Toy Story 4 line, with the Star Command logo reinstated but without prints on the arms or side of the legs. Two new minifigures were made for the spin off movie Lightyear with two sets featuring his regular space suit, with one set including an alternate head and hairpiece included to have him unmasked, and a third including one of him in the orange and gray suit he wears at the beginning of the film.

Reception and legacy 
 
In October 2007, readers of Empire voted Buzz No. 1 of the Top 20 Greatest Pixar Characters. They also rated him the 94th greatest movie character of all time.

Buzz Lightyear's classic line "To Infinity... and Beyond!" has seen usage not only on T-shirts but among philosophers and mathematical theorists as well. A book about the history of infinity from 1991 (4 years before Toy Story), by Eli Maor, uses the phrase for its title. Lucia Hall of The Humanist linked the film's plot to an interpretation of humanism. She compared the phrase to "All this and heaven, too!", indicating one who is happy with a life on Earth as well as having an afterlife. The 2008 quadruple platinum song "Single Ladies" by Beyoncé includes the lyric "...and delivers me to a destiny, to infinity and beyond." Astronauts used the phrase while sending the Buzz Lightyear figure into space. The action figure was used for experiments in zero-g. Also in 2008, the phrase made international news when it was reported that a father and son had continually repeated the phrase to help them keep track of each other while treading water for 15 hours in the Atlantic Ocean.

Buzz Lightyear himself was mentioned in the 2012 song "Boyfriend" by Canadian pop star Justin Bieber, for instance, in the lyric "I can be your Buzz Lightyear, fly across the globe."

The first stable public release of the Debian project used the name "Buzz" as the codename for the version 1.1.

See also

 Buzz Lightyear's Space Ranger Spin
 List of Toy Story characters

References

External links

 Official character page (current)
 Buzz Lightyear at Don Markstein's Toonopedia (former)

 
Toy Story characters
Extraterrestrial superheroes
Fictional police officers
Fictional characters based on real people
Fictional amputees
Fictional astronauts
Fictional dolls and dummies
Fictional space pilots
Male characters in animated films
Film characters introduced in 1995
Animated characters introduced in 1995
1990s toys
Male characters in film
Video game bosses